The  is a single-car diesel multiple unit (DMU) train type operated by the third-sector railway operator Kominato Railway on the  Kominato Line between  and  in Chiba Prefecture, Japan, since 1962. , all 14 of the Kiha 200 series cars built are in service.

History
14 KiHa 200 series cars were built between 1961 and 1977. The first cars entered service in January 1962.

Individual build histories
The individual car build histories of the fleet are as follows.

Fleet status
, all 14 Kiha 200 series cars are in service, based at the line's Goi Depot. All cars except 209 and 210 are air-conditioned.

Following news reports, the Kiha 200 series is to be replaced by the later Kiha 40 Model trains from Spring 2021 following renovations to the newer models joining the route. The earlier Kiha 200 series will be retired after some time with both models running the route.

Popular Culture 
This train appears to have been used in various Gachimuchi songs on YouTube, most notably "Haru Yo Koi (Right Version)", amassing over 2.6 million views. This song has often been a part of Twitch.tv culture with many tributes held for the passing of the idol Billy Herrington.

References

External links 

 Kominato Railway website 

Diesel multiple units of Japan
Train-related introductions in 1961
Nippon Sharyo multiple units